Joshua Martez Cooper (born December 5, 1980) is a former American football defensive end. He was signed by the San Francisco 49ers as an undrafted free agent in 2004. He played college football at Mississippi.

Cooper was also a member of the Frankfurt Galaxy, Buffalo Bills, New Orleans Saints  and Florida Tuskers.

Professional career

San Francisco 49ers
In 2004, Cooper started his career with the 49ers. In the preseason, he recorded a team high 3 sacks. By the beginning of the regular season the 49ers signed him to their practice squad. On Sept. 26, Cooper saw his first regular season action, in a backup role, against the Seattle Seahawks. He played in two games during the 2004 season. He was released on Aug 28, 2005.

Frankfurt Galaxy
In 2006, Cooper played for the Frankfurt Galaxy. He started all ten games and posted 26 tackles and 3 sacks in the regular season. He recorded 2 sack in the Galaxy's World Bowl Championship Win, tying the World Bowl Game record.

Buffalo Bills
On June 6, 2006 after returning from Frankfurt, Cooper signed with the Bills. He was released Aug 28 2006, before the start of the regular season.

New Orleans Saints
In October 2006 Cooper Signed with the Saints and was added to their practice squad. On December 3 against his former team, the 49ers, he recorded his first NFL sack, tackle, forced fumble and tip ball. After that game he remained active and made his first NFL start on December 31, against the Panthers. He recorded a career high 6 tackles among other stats. He also played in the NFC Championship game that year and recorded 4 tackles.
In 2007, Cooper had another solid year with the Saints. He started in 4 Games and participated in 13 of 16 games. After the 2007 season Cooper underwent a Bilateral Achilles Tendon surgery and was unable to participate in the 2008 season. He was released before training camp in 2008.

Florida Tuskers
Cooper was signed by the Florida Tuskers of the United Football League on August 17, 2009.

References

External links
Just Sports Stats

1980 births
Living people
People from Lanett, Alabama
Players of American football from Marietta, Georgia
American football defensive ends
Ole Miss Rebels football players
San Francisco 49ers players
Frankfurt Galaxy players
Buffalo Bills players
New Orleans Saints players
Florida Tuskers players
Las Vegas Locomotives players